Rakim Sanders (born July 8, 1989) is an American professional basketball player who last played for the Changwon LG Sakers of the Korean Basketball League. He played college basketball with the Boston College Eagles for three seasons, and with the Fairfield Stags, for one season. At a height of 1.96 m (6'5") tall, he can play at both the shooting guard and small forward positions, with small forward being his main position.

High school career
Born in Pawtucket, Rhode Island, Sanders attended St. Andrew's High School. He was the 2006–07 Gatorade Player of the Year for Rhode Island. In his junior year, he averaged 18.4 points and 5.9 rebounds per game while earning a spot of the all-state first team. He followed this up with another all-state first team spot his senior year, averaging 21.3 points per game and 8.3 rebounds per game while shooting 53 percent from the field. Sanders finished his high school career with 2,432 points.

College career

Freshman season
Sanders played right away for the Eagles, playing 28 minutes per game. He averaged 11.3 point, 4.6 rebounds, and 1 steal per game. Sanders struggled at the free throw line, hitting just 46% of his shots. However, he did have his most successful year from beyond the arc, hitting 38% of his threes. On February 14, Sanders had his first double-double, scoring 14 points and adding 12 rebounds against North Carolina State. The Eagles went 14–17, despite winning 10 of their first twelve games.

Sophomore season
In his sophomore year, Sanders started at small forward alongside BC stars Reggie Jackson and Tyrese Rice. It was the team's most successful year during Sanders' time at BC. The team went 22–12 (9–7 in ACC play), and lost in the first round of the NCAA Tournament to USC. The season was highlighted by an 85–78 win over a North Carolina Tar Heels team that was ranked first in the country and would go on to win that season's National Championship. Sanders had 22 points, 2 blocks, and a game-high 7 steals. Sanders hit two game winning shots for Boston college; one against Virginia Tech and one against Georgia Tech. Sanders had his best year in terms of scoring at BC, averaging 12.9 points per game to go along with 4.4 rebounds per game and 1.6 steals per game. He shared the team's defensive player of the year with forward Corey Raji.

Junior season
The BC team was hit hard by the graduation of Tyrese Rice entering Sanders' junior year. As a result, the team struggled despite the efforts of Sanders, Jackson, and Raji, finishing 15-16. Sanders averaged 11.3 points, 3.7 rebounds, and 1 steal per game. He elected to transfer at the end of the season following the departure of head coach Al Skinner. Bleacher Report called Sanders "arguably the best player on the Eagles' roster."

Senior season
Sanders was forced to sit out for a season before playing for Fairfield. He had high expectations entering the year. College Basketball expert Andy Katz said that Sanders had a high chance of making the Wooden Award watchlist. In one season with the Stags, Sanders averaged 16.6 points per game, 8.2 rebounds per game, and 1.4 steals per game. At Fairfield, Sanders gained a reputation as a high I.Q. player. Fairfield coach Sydney Johnson said "[Sanders] plays the game almost like a coach would in terms of how he's trying to put all the pieces together. He's consciously aware of the bigger picture on offense and defense." Sanders eventually led the Stags to the CIT semifinals. he led the team in points and rebounding, while earning first team All Metro Atlantic Athletic Conference and was also named to the All-Jesuit team, honoring the best players from 28 Jesuit universities. His point total of 615 was the second highest in school history, and he also became the first player in school history to score 600 points and grab 300 rebounds in one season. Following the season, Sanders was invited to the Portsmouth Invitational Tournament, where he was named to the all-tournament team, averaging 19.3 points and 8.7 rebounds per game.

Professional career

NBA draft
In the 2012 NBA draft, Sanders went undrafted. However, he was signed to play for the Golden State Warriors' Summer League Team.

Israel
After failing to catch on with an NBA team, Sanders signed a deal with Maccabi Tel Aviv, who loaned him out to Hapoel Gilboa Galil. In 29 Israeli Premier League games, he averaged 12.6 points, 4.0 rebounds, 1.7 assists, and 1.3 steals per game, while shooting 59.5% on two point field goals and 38.2% on threes. Also, in 15 games in Balkan International Basketball League play, he averaged 13.3 points, 6.3 rebounds, 1.6 assists, and 1.3 steals per game.

Brose Baskets
On August 13, 2013, Sanders signed a two-year contract with the German League team Brose Baskets.

Olimpia Milano
On November 16, 2015, he signed a contract with Olimpia Milano, and was cleared to play by January, as he was recovering from a wrist injury. He averaged 12.5 points, 3.5 rebounds, 1.2 assists and 1.1 steals per game.

FC Barcelona
On July 10, 2017, Sanders signed with FC Barcelona.

Erie BayHawks

For the 2019–20 season, Sanders joined the Erie BayHawks of the G League as a local tryout player. He averaged 5.2 points and 3.5 rebounds per game.

Changwon LG Sakers
Sanders signed with Changwon LG Sakers of the Korean league on January 14, 2020.

On July 21, 2020, he has signed with Hapoel Be'er Sheva of the Israeli Premier League. However, Sanders opted out of his contract on August 25 due to personal issues.

Career statistics

EuroLeague

|-
| style="text-align:left;"| 2013–14
| style="text-align:left;"| Brose
| 10 || 2 || 18.4 || .500 || .450 || .667 || 3.2 || .4 || .8 || .1 || 7.9 || 6.6
|-
| style="text-align:left;"| 2014–15
| style="text-align:left;"| Sassari
| 8 || 7 || 27.6 || .406 || .326 || .625 || 3.0 || .5 || .9 || .0 || 13.4 || 6.8
|-
| style="text-align:left;"| 2016–17
| style="text-align:left;"| Milano
| 24 || 11 || 22.5 || .524 || .406 || .667 || 3.5 || 1.2 || 1.1 || .2 || 12.5 || 10.4
|- class="sortbottom"
| style="text-align:left;"| Career
| style="text-align:left;"|
| 18 || 9 || 22.1 || .443 || .365 || .639 || 3.1 || .4 || .8 || .1 || 10.3 || 6.7

References

External links
 Rakim Sanders at acb.com 
 Rakim Sanders at draftexpress.com
 Rakim Sanders at eurobasket.com
 Rakim Sanders at euroleague.net
 Rakim Sanders at fiba.com
 Rakim Sanders at legabasket.it 

1989 births
Living people
American expatriate basketball people in Germany
American expatriate basketball people in Israel
American expatriate basketball people in Italy
American expatriate basketball people in Spain
American men's basketball players
Basketball players from Rhode Island
Boston College Eagles men's basketball players
Brose Bamberg players
Dinamo Sassari players
Erie BayHawks (2019–2021) players
Fairfield Stags men's basketball players
FC Barcelona Bàsquet players
Hapoel Gilboa Galil Elyon players
Lega Basket Serie A players
Liga ACB players
Olimpia Milano players
Sportspeople from Pawtucket, Rhode Island
Shooting guards
Small forwards